Philip Ball (born 1962) is a British science writer. For over twenty years he has been an editor of the journal Nature for which he continues to write regularly. He now writes a regular column in Chemistry World. He has contributed to publications ranging from New Scientist to the New York Times, The Guardian, the Financial Times and New Statesman. He is the regular contributor to Prospect magazine, and also a columnist for Chemistry World, Nature Materials and BBC Future. He has broadcast on many occasions on radio and TV, and in June 2004 he presented a three-part serial on nanotechnology, Small Worlds, on BBC Radio 4.

Work
Ball's 2004 book Critical Mass: How One Thing Leads to Another was the winner of the 2005 Aventis Prize for Science Books.  It examines a wide range of topics including the business cycle, random walks, phase transitions, bifurcation theory, traffic flow, Zipf's law, Small world phenomenon, catastrophe theory, the Prisoner's dilemma. The overall theme is one of applying modern mathematical models to social and economic phenomena.

In 2011, Ball published The Music Instinct in which he discusses how we make sense of sound and Music and emotion. He outlines what is known and still unknown about how music has such an emotional impact, and why it seems indispensable to humanity. He has since argued that music is emotively powerful due to its ability to mimic humans and through setting up expectations in pitch and harmony and then violating them.

Ball holds a degree in chemistry from Oxford and a doctorate in physics from Bristol University.  As of 2008 he lives in London.

Books

Designing the Molecular World: Chemistry at the Frontier (1994), 
Made to Measure: New Materials for the 21st Century (1997), 
The Self-made Tapestry: Pattern Formation in Nature (1999), 
H2O: A Biography of Water (1999),  (published in the U.S. as Life's Matrix)
Stories of the Invisible: A Guided Tour of Molecules (2001),  (republished as Molecules: A Very Short Introduction (2003), OUP)
Bright Earth: The Invention of Colour (2001), 
The Ingredients: A Guided Tour of the Elements (2002),  (republished as The Elements: A Very Short Introduction (2004), OUP)
Critical Mass: How One Thing Leads to Another (2004), 
Elegant Solutions: Ten Beautiful Experiments in Chemistry (2005), 
The Devil's Doctor: Paracelsus and the World of Renaissance Magic and Science (2006), 
The Sun and Moon Corrupted, a novel, Portobello Books Ltd, (2008), 
Universe of Stone: A Biography of Chartres Cathedral (2008), 
Shapes, Nature's Patterns, a Tapestry in three Parts (2009), 
Flow, Nature's Patterns, a Tapestry in three Parts (2009), 
Branches, Nature's Patterns, a Tapestry in three Parts (2009), 
The Music Instinct (2010), 
Unnatural, The Heretical Idea of Making People (2011), 
Why Society is a Complex Matter: Meeting Twenty-first Century Challenges with a New Kind of Science (2012), 
Curiosity: How Science Became Interested in Everything (2013), 
Serving the Reich: The Struggle for the Soul of Physics under Hitler (2014),  Read an excerpt.
Invisible: The Dangerous Allure of the Unseen (2015), University of Chicago Press, ; (2014), Random House
Patterns in Nature: Why the Natural World Looks the Way It Does (2016), 
The Water Kingdom: A Secret History of China (2017), 
Beyond Weird: Why Everything You Thought You Knew About Quantum Physics is Different (2018), 
How to Grow a Human: Adventures in Who We Are and How We Are Made (2019),

Awards

His book Critical Mass: How One Thing Leads to Another won the 2005 Royal Society Winton Prize for Science Books, and his book Serving the Reich: The Struggle for the Soul of Physics under Hitler (The Bodley Head) was on the shortlist for the 2014 prize. In 2019 he won the Kelvin Medal and Prize.

References

External links
 

1962 births
Living people
Alumni of the University of Oxford
Alumni of the University of Bristol
English male journalists
English science writers
People associated with The Institute for Cultural Research